Franworks Group is a Calgary based company which franchises restaurant concepts. As of 2016, the company has 99 restaurants operating under three banners in two countries.

Elephant & Castle 
Elephant and Castle Pub and Restaurant (also called "E&C") is an English pub concept  that combines British classics with North American favourites. It was founded in Vancouver, British Columbia in 1977. Franworks Group acquired the brand in 2012, thus joining it to an established roster of restaurants including Original Joe's and State & Main. Elephant & Castle currently operates several establishments across Canada and the United States.  It takes its name from the eponymous area in London. In 2020 it opened various restaurants in Ireland and the UK.

See also
List of Canadian restaurant chains
Recipe Unlimited

References

External links
 
 Original Joe's website
 Elephant and Castle website
 State & Main website

Companies based in Calgary
Restaurant chains in Canada
Restaurant chains in the United States
Drinking establishment chains
Drinking establishments in Canada
Restaurants established in 1977
1977 establishments in British Columbia